Zinc finger protein Gfi-1b is a protein that in humans is encoded by the GFI1B gene.

References

Further reading